The Church of St. Cajetan (Portuguese: Igreja de São Caetano), is located in the village of Assagao in Bardez, Goa. It was built as a chapel in  the year 1775.

See also
Assagao

References

Colonial Goa
Monuments and memorials in Goa
Tourist attractions in North Goa district
Roman Catholic churches completed in 1775
1775 establishments in India
Roman Catholic churches in Goa
Churches in North Goa district
18th-century Roman Catholic church buildings in India